Seljuk pottery was the pottery of the Seljuk Empire. With the end of the Seljuk Empire in the 14th century, the Ottoman Empire took over some of the traditions of the Seljuks, especially in the early stages of İznik pottery.

Tiles are known from the Seljuk period, which use the minai technique. The technique involved the use of seven colors, with blue, green and turquoise applied on an underglaze and fired. Other colors such as yellow, red, white, black and sometimes gilt were then applied on top of this, and re-fired at a lower temperature.

See also
Islamic pottery

References

Pottery of the Seljuk Empire
Turkish art
Islamic pottery
Persian art